Casimir James Konstanty (March 2, 1917 – June 11, 1976) was an American relief pitcher in Major League Baseball and National League Most Valuable Player of . He played for the Cincinnati Reds (1944), Boston Braves (1946), Philadelphia Phillies (1948–1954), New York Yankees (1954–1956) and St. Louis Cardinals (1956).

Early life
Originally from the New York hamlet of Strykersville, he was the son of a farmer. Konstanty starred in sports in high school in Arcade, New York, and also at Syracuse University, where he earned a bachelor of science degree. He was a member of the university basketball team from 1936 to 1939. Konstanty was a physical education teacher in Saint Regis Falls, New York, before becoming a professional baseball player. He pitched in semi-pro leagues for the Malone Maroons and the Massena Alcos (sponsored by the Aluminum Company of America) in 1940 and 1941. In one game he struck out 11 batters while playing for Massena.

Career

Konstanty began his pro career in 1941 at age 24. Then he spent three seasons in the minors until , when the Phillies called him up. He became a relief specialist who employed a slider and a change-up with great effectiveness.

In , when the Phils "Whiz Kids" won the National League pennant, Konstanty was named the Most Valuable Player; to date, he is the only National League relief pitcher to achieve such an honor. He appeared in 74 games (then a major league record), winning 16 games with a National League leading 22 saves. He made the NL All-Star team and received the  AP Athlete of the Year and the TSN Pitcher of the Year awards. In a surprise move, he was named to start Game 1 of the 1950 World Series against the New York Yankees. Konstanty gave up only four hits in eight innings but lost 1-0, his efforts outdone by Vic Raschi's two-hit shutout.

He played two seasons in New York, half a season for the St. Louis Cardinals, and a few games for the San Francisco Seals before retiring in 1957. In his 11-season career, Konstanty posted a 66-48 record with 74 saves and a 3.46 ERA in 433 games. In 945 innings pitched, he struck out 268 and allowed 957 hits and 269 bases on balls. In his 36 games started, he amassed 14 complete games and two shutouts.

Post-playing career
Konstanty lived in Worcester, New York. He opened a sporting goods store in Oneonta, New York in 1948, and he would operate that store until 1973.  He served as a minor-league pitching coach for the St. Louis Cardinals. From 1968 to 1972 he was the director of athletics at Hartwick College in Oneonta, New York.  He lived in Worcester until his death at the age of 59.

In 2008, Casimir (Jim) Konstanty was elected into the National Polish-American Sports Hall of Fame.

See also

 List of Major League Baseball annual saves leaders

References

External links

Jim Konstanty at SABR (Baseball BioProject)
Jim Konstanty at Baseball Almanac

1917 births
1976 deaths
American men's basketball players
American people of Polish descent
Baseball players from New York (state)
Cincinnati Reds players
Major League Baseball pitchers
National League All-Stars
National League Most Valuable Player Award winners
New York Yankees players
People from Worcester, New York
Philadelphia Phillies players
Richmond Virginians (minor league) players
St. Louis Cardinals players
San Francisco Seals (baseball) players
Springfield Nationals players
Syracuse Chiefs players
Syracuse Orangemen baseball players
Syracuse Orange men's basketball players
Toronto Maple Leafs (International League) players